Brelett is a Norwegian brand of margarine produced by Fjordland. It has a market share of 72% in the domestic light margarine category. The margarine contains both milk and vegetable fats, giving it a more buttery taste than pure margarine. In 2006 10,347,395 packages of Brelett were sold.

The product was launched by the cooperative dairy Tine in 1987, though it was transferred to Fjordland in 1995. Brelett is sold in three sizes: 250 g, 400 g and 550 g. In addition 250 g packages are available with olive and yogurt based Brelett.

References

External links
 Fjordland on Brelett

Norwegian brands